Pierre Émile Cartier (born 10 June 1932) is a French mathematician. An associate of the Bourbaki group and at one time a colleague of Alexander Grothendieck, his interests have ranged over algebraic geometry, representation theory, mathematical physics, and category theory.

He studied at the École Normale Supérieure in Paris under Henri Cartan and André Weil. Since his 1958 thesis on algebraic geometry he has worked in a number of fields. He is known for the introduction of the Cartier operator in algebraic geometry in characteristic p, and for work on duality of abelian varieties and on formal groups. He is the eponym of Cartier divisors and Cartier duality.

From 1961 to 1971 he was a professor at the University of Strasbourg.  In 1970 he was an Invited Speaker at the International Congress of Mathematicians in Nice.  He was awarded the 1978 Prize Ampère of the French Academy of Sciences. In 2012 he became a fellow of the American Mathematical Society.

Publications 
  (1st edition 1969)
  (1st edition 1992)
 
 Freedom in Mathematics, Springer India, 2016 (with Cédric Villani, Jean Dhombres, Gerhard Heinzmann), .
 Translation from the French language edition: Mathématiques en liberté, La Ville Brûle, Montreuil 2012, .
 Pierre Cartier: Alexander Grothendieck. A country known only by name. Notices AMS, vol. 62, 2015, no. 4, pp. 373–382, PDF.

as editor
  (1st edition 1990)

References

External links

Cartier's website at the Institut des Hautes Études Scientifiques, with a photograph, CV, and list of publications
Issue of Moscow Mathematical Journal dedicated to Pierre Cartier
 
 Javier Fresán The Castle of Groups, Interview with Pierre Cartier, EMS Newsletter 2009, pdf

1932 births
Living people
People from Sedan, Ardennes
École Normale Supérieure alumni
Academic staff of the University of Strasbourg
20th-century French mathematicians
21st-century French mathematicians
Institute for Advanced Study visiting scholars
Nicolas Bourbaki
Fellows of the American Mathematical Society